Odo of Troyes may refer to:
Odo I, Count of Troyes (died 871)
Odo II, Count of Troyes (fl. 876)
Odo, Count of Champagne (died 1115)